In Tshabalala v Tshabalala, an important case in the South African law of succession, the will in question comprised two pages, but the commissioner signed only the second page and neglected to sign the first page, which actually contained the contents of the will. The will was thus rejected.

The testator’s granddaughter (the sole heiress in the will) sought an order from the court declaring the will valid. The court held that the will did not comply with the statutory formalities, and was thus invalid; accordingly, the deceased was held to have died intestate.

References 
 Tshabalala v Tshabalala 1980 (1) SA 134 (OPD).

Law of succession in South Africa
South African case law
1980 in case law
1980 in South African law